Pseudoliotia radians is a species of small sea snail, a marine gastropod mollusk, in the family Tornidae.

Distribution
This marine species occurs off the Northern Territories, Australia

References

 Rubio F. & Rolán E. (2018). The genus Pseudoliotia Tate, 1898 (Gastropoda, Vitrinellidae) in the Tropical Indo-Pacific. Iberus. suppl. 7: 1-117.

External links
 Laseron, C. 1958. Liotiidae and allied molluscs from the Dampierian Zoogeographical Province. Rec. Aust. Mus. Vol. 24 (11) pp. 165–182, figs 1-87
 To World Register of Marine Species
 Australian Faunal Directory: Discroliotia radians

radians
Gastropods described in 1958